The Hilma Hooker is a shipwreck in Bonaire in the Caribbean Netherlands.  It is a popular wreck diving site.

Ship history
The vessel was built at the Van der Giessen de Noord shipyard in Krimpen aan den IJssel, Netherlands, for the shipping company Scheepvaart En Steenkolen Mij. N. V. She was launched on 21 May 1951 and named Midsland. In 1964 the ship was sold to Caribbean Association Traders of Panama, and renamed Mistral. She was sold again in 1967 to the Bahamas Line and renamed William Express. On 18 July 1975 the ship sank off Samaná, Dominican Republic. She was refloated and sold to Benjamin Catrone of Panama and renamed Anna C. The ship was soon sold again being bought in 1976 by the Seacoast Shipping Corp. of Panama  and renamed Doric Express. Finally, in 1979 she was sold to the San Andrés Shipping Line of San Andrés, Colombia, and renamed Hilma Hooker.

Sinking
In the summer of 1984, the Hilma Hooker had engine problems at sea and was towed to the port of Kralendijk, Bonaire. It was already under surveillance by drug enforcement agencies. Docked at the Town Pier, local authorities boarded the ship for an inspection when her captain was unable to produce any of the requisite registration papers. The Hilma Hooker and her crew were subsequently detained while the local authorities on Bonaire searched for the vessel's owners, who were never found.

The ship languished under detention as evidence for many months and through general neglect of her hull she began to take on considerable amounts of water. It was feared that she would sink at the main dock on the island and disrupt maritime traffic. After many months of being tied to the pier and pumped of water, on September 7, 1984 the Hooker was towed to an anchorage. As the days passed, a slight list became noticeable. The list was even more obvious one morning. The owner was still not coming forward to claim the ship and maintain it so the many leaks added up until on the morning of September 12, 1984 the Hilma Hooker began taking in water through her lower portholes. At 9:08 am she rolled over on her starboard side and, in the next two minutes, disappeared.

Dive site
The Hilma Hooker came to rest on a sand flat between two coral reef systems in an area known to divers as Angel City. The wreck has subsequently become a prime attraction for scuba divers. However, relatively little of the wreck involves penetration diving.

The Hilma Hooker is regarded as one of the leading wreck diving sites in the Caribbean, according to Scuba Diving Travel Magazine.

References

Sources
 
 

1951 ships
Wreck diving sites
Tourist attractions in Bonaire
Underwater diving sites in the Caribbean
Shipwrecks of the Netherlands Antilles
Maritime incidents in 1984